Leposternon bagual is a worm lizard species in the family Amphisbaenidae. It is found in Argentina.

References

Leposternon
Reptiles described in 2015
Taxa named by Síria Ribeiro
Taxa named by Alfredo P. Santos Jr.
Taxa named by Hussam Zaher
Endemic fauna of Argentina
Reptiles of Argentina